Chester Frank Adams (October 24, 1915 – October 27, 1990) was a professional American football tackle and placekicker who played ten seasons in the National Football League (NFL) and All-America Football Conference (AAFC), mainly with the Cleveland Rams and Cleveland Browns. He was selected to the NFL's All-Star game twice. In 1978, he was inducted into the Greater Cleveland Sports Hall of Fame.

Adams grew up in Cleveland and went to college at Ohio University. After graduating, he played four seasons for the Cleveland Rams before World War II forced the team to suspend operations in 1943. Adams was put out on loan to the Green Bay Packers, where he played for a year before joining the U.S. Army.

When Adams returned from duty, the Rams had moved to Los Angeles, and he signed up to play for the Cleveland Browns, a team under formation in the AAFC. The Rams sued to prevent him from playing for the Browns, but Adams won. He stayed with Cleveland between 1946 and 1948, a span during which the team won three AAFC championships. He was then traded to the Buffalo Bills, where he stayed for a year. He played for the NFL's New York Yanks for a final year before retiring.

Early life and college

Adams was born in Cleveland, Ohio and attended the city's South High School. After graduating, he went to Ohio University in Athens, Ohio.

Football career

Adams was drafted in 1939 by the Cleveland Rams of the National Football League (NFL) and played for the team until 1942. He was selected to play in the NFL's All-Star game in 1941 and 1942. Adams then played one season for the Green Bay Packers on loan from the Rams after the Rams suspended operations during World War II. Adams joined the U.S. Army in 1944 and served for 30 months until his discharge in the summer of 1946.

Adams, who was a placekicker as well as a guard, signed a contract to play for the Rams in 1946, but Rams owner Dan Reeves moved the team to Los Angeles after the 1945 season. Adams refused to move to Los Angeles with the team, and the Rams sued him in federal court after he signed with the Cleveland Browns, a team under formation in the new All-America Football Conference (AAFC). Adams claimed that he had no obligation under his contract to play for the Rams because the team was described as the Cleveland Rams, and its name had changed to the Los Angeles Rams following the move. The Rams filed an injunction in August 1946 to prevent him from playing for the Browns.

Later that month, Adams testified before a federal court that he injured his leg in the College All-Star Game while playing for Green Bay in 1945 and was not, as the Rams claimed, a player of "unique ability". Red Conkright, a one-time Rams assistant who moved to the Browns' staff, testified that Adams was an "erratic" kicker and "at present a second-team player". At the end of the month, federal judge Emerich Freed denied the Rams' injunction, allowing Adams to play for the Browns. The judge rejected the Rams' contention that Adams had signed to play for Reeves, not a specific team. He ruled the Cleveland Rams had ceased to exist, and that Adams therefore had no obligation to fulfill a contract with the Los Angeles Rams. Four other former Rams players joined the Browns along with Adams: Tommy Colella, Don Greenwood, Mike Scarry and Gaylon Smith.

In the Browns' first season in 1946, Adams played on the line and shared kicking duties with Lou Groza. In a 66–14 win that December over the AAFC's Brooklyn Dodgers, he scored a touchdown on a blocked punt and kicked five extra points. The Browns advanced to the AAFC championship that year, and Adams, who had played primarily at right defensive tackle, was asked to do the team's place-kicking after Groza suffered a sprained ankle in an earlier game. The Browns beat the Yankees 14–9 in the championship game.

Adams continued to play as a defensive tackle and a backup to Groza in 1947. Then 32 years old, he suffered neck and back injuries in a game against Los Angeles. He re-injured his neck in the championship game, another win over the Yankees.

Adams was part of a Cleveland team that won all of its games in 1948 and ended the season by beating the Buffalo Bills for a third straight championship. The Browns traded Adams before the 1949 season to the Bills in a five-player deal. Cleveland coach Paul Brown said the team needed to stay fresh after winning three championships. Adams played a year in Buffalo, mainly as a kicker. He then played a final year for the New York Yanks of the National Football League.

Later life and death

Adams was inducted into the Greater Cleveland Sports Hall of Fame in 1978. He died on October 27, 1990.

References

Bibliography

External links

 Greater Cleveland Sports Hall of Fame biography
 

1915 births
1990 deaths
Players of American football from Cleveland
American football offensive tackles
United States Army personnel of World War II
Ohio Bobcats football players
Cleveland Rams players
Green Bay Packers players
Cleveland Browns (AAFC) players
Buffalo Bills (AAFC) players
New York Yanks players
United States Army soldiers